Aguna metophis, the tailed aguna, is a species of dicot skipper in the butterfly family Hesperiidae. It is found in Central America, North America, and South America.

References

Further reading

 

Eudaminae
Articles created by Qbugbot
Butterflies described in 1824